Himrod is a hamlet in Yates County, New York, United States. Himrod has a post office with ZIP code 14842, which opened on December 28, 1831.

See also
Himrod Junction (New York)

References

Hamlets in Yates County, New York
Hamlets in New York (state)